Trevor Denton is an English former professional rugby league footballer who played in the 1960s and 1970s.

Background
Trevor Denton worked as an electrician for the National Coal Board (NCB) at Lofthouse Colliery in Wakefield, and Prince of Wales Colliery in Pontefract.

References

External links
 Search for "Denton" at rugbyleagueproject.org

Doncaster R.L.F.C. players
Halifax R.L.F.C. players
Place of birth missing
Rugby league five-eighths
English rugby league players
Year of birth missing